Ameni may refer to:

Ameni, Egyptian prince on whose stele 20th century BCE  Haankhes and Sobekemsaf I, Vayigash are recorded
Ameny, Amenemhat II
Ameni, old spelling of Amini, India